Black Candy is the third album by indie rock band Beat Happening.

Track listing
All tracks written by Beat Happening.

 "Other Side" – 3:35
 "Black Candy" – 3:00
 "Knick Knack" – 2:13
 "Pajama Party in a Haunted Hive" – 4:38
 "Gravedigger Blues" – 2:26
 "Cast a Shadow" – 2:31
 "Bonfire" – 3:12
 "T.V. Girl" – 2:31
 "Playhouse" – 2:30
 "Ponytail" – 3:27

Cover versions

Beat Happening’s songs from Black Candy have been covered by other artists:

 Sonic Youth released a version of the album’s title track featuring vocals by Kim Gordon.
 Both Cub and  Yo La Tengo have rendered their own versions of “Cast A Shadow”.

References

Beat Happening albums
K Records albums
1989 albums
Albums produced by Steve Fisk